Gerhard Pfister (born 1 October 1962) is a Swiss politician. He has served as a member of the National Council. Since 2016, he has been the president of the Christian Democrats.

Biography
Pfister was born on 1 October 1962 in Zug in the Canton of Zug. His parents operated a private boarding school. He studied there before moving on to Disentis Abbey school. He studied philosophy and literature at the University of Fribourg. He taught at the school and took over operations after the death of his father in 1994. The school closed in 2012.

In 1998, he was elected to the Cantonal Council of Zug where he served through 2003. He then became the party president in Zug in 1999, a position he held in until 2008. He won a seat in the National Council in 2003. He was re-elected in 2007 and 2011.

In 2016, he was elected as the president of the Christian Democrats, succeeding Christophe Darbellay.

References

External links
Official page
Personal website

1962 births
Living people
21st-century Swiss politicians
Members of the National Council (Switzerland)
University of Fribourg alumni
People from Zug